Nupedia was an English-language, online encyclopedia whose articles were written by volunteer contributors with appropriate subject matter expertise, reviewed by expert editors before publication, and licensed as free content. It was founded by Jimmy Wales and underwritten by Bomis, with Larry Sanger as editor-in-chief. Nupedia operated from October 1999 until September 2003. It is best known today as the predecessor of Wikipedia. Nupedia had a seven-step approval process to control content of articles before being posted, rather than live wiki-based updating. Nupedia was designed by committee, with experts to predefine the rules, and it had only 21 articles in its first year, compared to Wikipedia posting 200 articles in the first month, and 18,000 in the first year.

Unlike Wikipedia, Nupedia was not a wiki; it was instead characterized by an extensive peer-review process, designed to make its articles of a quality comparable to that of professional encyclopedias. Nupedia wanted scholars (ideally with PhDs) to volunteer content. Before it ceased operating, Nupedia produced 24 approved articles that had completed its review process and another 150 articles were in progress. Wales preferred Wikipedia's easier posting of articles, while Sanger preferred the peer-reviewed approach used by Nupedia and later founded Citizendium in 2006 as an expert-reviewed alternative to Wikipedia.

History
In October 1999, Jimmy Wales began thinking about an online encyclopedia built by volunteers and, in January 2000, hired Larry Sanger to oversee its development. The project officially went online on 9 March 2000.
By November 2000, however, only two full-length articles had been published.

From its beginning, Nupedia was a free content encyclopedia, with Bomis intending to generate revenue from online ads on Nupedia.com. Initially the project used a homegrown license, the Nupedia Open Content License. In January 2001, it switched to the GNU Free Documentation License at the urging of Richard Stallman and the Free Software Foundation. Also in January 2001, Nupedia started Wikipedia as a side-project to allow collaboration on articles before entering the peer review process. This attracted interest from both sides, as it provided the less bureaucratic structure favored by advocates of the GNE encyclopedia. As a result, GNE never really developed, and the threat of competition between the projects was averted. As Wikipedia grew and attracted contributors, it quickly developed a life of its own and began to function largely independently of Nupedia, although Sanger initially led activity on Wikipedia by virtue of his position as Nupedia's editor-in-chief.

Besides leading to discontinuation of the GNE project, Wikipedia also led to the gradual demise of Nupedia. Due to the collapse of the internet economy at that time, Jimmy Wales decided to discontinue funding for a salaried editor-in-chief in December 2001, and Sanger resigned from both projects shortly thereafter. After Sanger's departure, Nupedia increasingly became an afterthought to Wikipedia; of the Nupedia articles that completed the review process, only two did so after 2001. As Nupedia dwindled into inactivity, the idea of converting it into a stable version of approved Wikipedia articles was occasionally broached, but never implemented. Nupedia's server later crashed in September 2003. Nupedia's encyclopedic content was assimilated into Wikipedia.

Editorial process

Nupedia had a seven-step editorial process, consisting of:
Assignment
Finding a lead reviewer
Lead review
Open review
Lead copyediting
Open copyediting
Final approval and markup

Authors were expected to have expert knowledge (although the definition of expert allowed for a degree of flexibility, and it was acknowledged that some articles could be written by a good writer, rather than an expert per se) and the editors approving articles for publication were expected "to be true experts in their fields and (with few exceptions) [to] possess PhDs".

Ruth Ifcher was someone Sanger depended upon and worked closely with on Nupedia's early policies and procedures. Ifcher, holding several higher degrees, was a computer programmer and former copy editor and agreed to be volunteer chief copy editor.

Software development
Nupedia was powered by NupeCode collaborative software. NupeCode is free/open source software (released under the GNU General Public License) designed for large peer review projects. The code was available via Nupedia's CVS repository. One of the problems experienced by Nupedia during much of its existence was that the software lacked functionality. Much of the missing functionality had been mocked-up using underlined blocks of text which appeared to be hyperlinks, but actually were not.

As part of the project, a new version of the original software (called "NuNupedia") was under development. NuNupedia was implemented for testing at SourceForge, but never reached a sufficient stage of development to replace the original software.

See also

 List of online encyclopedias
 List of wikis
 Scholarpedia

References

Further reading
 Larry Sanger, The Early History of Nupedia and Wikipedia: A Memoir Part 1 and Part 2. Slashdot, April 2005.
 Larry Sanger, "Nupedia.com Statement of Editorial Policy, Version 2.1," Printable Version dated 10 May 2000.
 Larry Sanger, "Nupedia.com Statement of Editorial Policy, Version 3.2," Printable Version dated 23 June 2000.

External links

 Earlier versions of Nupedia (from the Internet Archive)
 Nupedia— revived Nupedia on Fandom

History of Wikipedia
Internet properties established in 2000
Internet properties disestablished in 2003
2003 disestablishments in the United States
Defunct websites
Jimmy Wales